Valentín Larralde (born 15 November 2000) is an Argentine professional footballer who plays as a midfielder for San Martín de Tucumán of Primera Nacional.

Career
Larralde spent his embryonic years with a local team in El Pato, which preceded a two-year stint with Independiente and subsequently Gimnasia y Esgrima. In 2018, Larralde joined Defensa y Justicia. 2020 saw the central midfielder move into Hernán Crespo's first-team. He was initially an unused substitute for Copa Libertadores group stage wins over Delfín and Olimpia, before making his senior debut in the away match with Delfín on 1 October 2020; coming on for the final ten minutes of a three-goal defeat. Larralde signed his first professional contract a week later.

In June 2021, Larralde was loaned out to Arsenal Sarandí for the rest of 2021. After returning from the spell, he was loaned out again, this time to San Martín de Tucumán until the end of 2022.

Career statistics
.

Notes

References

External links

2000 births
Living people
People from Berazategui Partido
Argentine people of Basque descent
Argentine footballers
Argentine expatriate footballers
Association football midfielders
Argentine Primera División players
Defensa y Justicia footballers
Arsenal de Sarandí footballers
San Martín de Tucumán footballers
O'Higgins F.C. footballers
Chilean Primera División players
Expatriate footballers in Chile
Sportspeople from Buenos Aires Province